Plymouth Adventure is a 1952 Technicolor drama film with an ensemble cast starring Spencer Tracy, Gene Tierney, Van Johnson and Leo Genn, made by Metro-Goldwyn-Mayer, directed by Clarence Brown, and produced by Dore Schary.  The screenplay was adapted by Helen Deutsch from the 1950 novel The Voyage of the Mayflower by Ernest Gébler. The supporting cast includes Barry Jones, Dawn Addams, Lloyd Bridges and John Dehner.

This was veteran director Brown's final film.

Plot
The film tells a fictionalized version of the Pilgrims' voyage across the Atlantic Ocean to North America aboard the Mayflower. During the long sea voyage, Capt. Christopher Jones (Spencer Tracy) falls in love with Dorothy Bradford (Gene Tierney), the wife of William Bradford (Leo Genn). The love triangle is resolved in a tragic way at the film's conclusion.  Ship's carpenter John Alden (Van Johnson)—said to be the first person to set foot on Plymouth Rock in 1620—catches the eye of Priscilla Mullins (Dawn Addams), one of the young Pilgrims following William Bradford.  Alden ultimately wins Priscilla in another, if subtler, triangle with Miles Standish (Noel Drayton).   Lloyd Bridges provides comic relief as the first-mate Coppin, and child star Tommy Ivo gives a touching performance as young William Button, the only passenger to die on the actual voyage across the storm-swept Atlantic, who, according to this film, wanted to be the first to sight land and to become a king in the New World. “I’m going to be the first to see land. Keep me eye peeled, I will. Then I’ll be the first. It’ll be like the Garden of Eden and I’m going to be the first to see it”.

Cast
 Spencer Tracy as Christopher Jones
 Gene Tierney as Dorothy Bradford
 Van Johnson as John Alden
 Leo Genn as William Bradford
 Barry Jones as William Brewster
 Dawn Addams as Priscilla Mullins
 Lloyd Bridges as First Mate Coppin
 Noel Drayton as Miles Standish
 John Dehner as Gilbert Winslow
 Tommy Ivo as William Butten
 Lowell Gilmore as Edward Winslow
 Paul Cavanagh as Governor John Carver (uncredited)
 Don Dillaway as Stephen Hopkins (uncredited)
 Elizabeth Flournoy as Rose Standish (uncredited)
 Ivis Goulding as Alice Mullins (uncredited)
 Harvey M. Guzik as Oceanus Hopkins (uncredited)
 Elizabeth Harrower as Elizabeth Hopkins (uncredited)
 Kathleen Lockhart as Mary Brewster (uncredited)
 Murray Matheson as Christopher Martin (uncredited)
 Matt Moore as William Mullins (uncredited)
 Hugh Pryne as Samuel Fuller (uncredited)
 John Sherman as John Billington (uncredited)
Rhys Williams as Mr. Weston (uncredited)

Production
Schary said at the time "I don't think that historical era has been done properly on screen before because the people were too soft. The pilgrims had to be tough and lusty to accomplish what they did. So that's the kind we cast in the film."

Reception
According to MGM records, the film earned $1,909,000 in the U.S. and Canada and $1,116,000 elsewhere; but, because of its high cost, ended up incurring a loss of $1,856,000.

Major film reviewers in newspapers and magazines tended to praise the film's production values, while noting to different degrees performances and lapses in historical accuracy.

Awards and honors
The picture won the Oscar for Best Effects.
The actual model of the Mayflower ship from the movie is on display at the Original Benjamin's Calabash Seafood restaurant in Myrtle Beach, South Carolina. The model was purchased in an auction in the mid-1980s.

See also
 Plymouth Colony
 List of passengers on the Mayflower

References
Notes

External links
 
 
 
 

1952 films
1950s historical drama films
American historical drama films
American films based on actual events
Films based on Irish novels
Films directed by Clarence Brown
Films set in 1620
Films set in Massachusetts
Films set in the Thirteen Colonies
Films set in England
Films that won the Best Visual Effects Academy Award
Mayflower
Metro-Goldwyn-Mayer films
Sea adventure films
Films scored by Miklós Rózsa
1950s English-language films
1950s American films